Nasha Slova is a newspaper published in Belarus.

Profile
The publisher of Nasha Slova is the Frantsishak Skaryna Belarusian Language Society. Its sister newspaper is  Novy Chas, a weekly paper.

See also
 List of newspapers in Belarus

References

Newspapers published in Belarus
Belarusian-language newspapers
Mass media in Minsk